Polygonal, patterned ground is quite common in some regions of Mars.  It is commonly believed to be caused by the sublimation of ice from the ground.  Sublimation is the direct change of solid ice to a gas.  This is similar to what happens to dry ice on the Earth.  Places on Mars that display polygonal ground may indicate where future colonists can find water ice.  Low center polygons have been proposed as a marker for ground ice.

Patterned ground forms in a mantle layer, called latitude dependent mantle, that fell from the sky when the climate was different.

On Mars, researches have found patterned ground that formed from fractures and patterned ground formed by the arrangement of boulders.  It is not yet clear what caused boulders to form patterns, but it does not seem that fractures caused the boulders to move around.

Polygons in Mare Australe quadrangle

Polygons in Casius quadrangle

Polygons in Hellas quadrangle

Sizes and formation of polygonal ground

Fractured polygonal ground is generally divided into two kinds: high center and low center.  The middle of a high center polygon is 10 meters across and its troughs are 2–3 meters wide.  Low center polygons are 5–10 meters across and the boundary ridges are 3–4 meters wide.

High center polygons are higher in the center and lower along their boundaries.  It forms from increased sublimation around cracks in a surface.  Cracks are common in ice-rich surfaces. 

The cracks provide a place of increased surface area for sublimation.  After a time the narrow cracks widen to become troughs.

Low center polygons are thought to develop from the high center polygons.  The troughs along the edges of high center polygons may become filled with sediment.  This thick sediment will retard sublimation, so more sublimation will take place in the center that is protected by a thinner lag deposit.  In time, the middle becomes lower than the outer parts.  The sediments from the troughs will turn into ridges.

High-center polygons in Noachis quadrangle

High-center polygons in Ismenius Lacus quadrangle

Clastic patterned ground
Many areas of patterned ground were formed by boulders.  For, as yet unknown reasons, boulders are often arranged in various shapes that include polygons.  A study around Lomonosov Crater found that they were not caused by fracture networks.  Clastic patterned ground has been found across the Northern Plains.  Another site was Elysium Planitia.  Researchers also found this terrain in the Argyre Basin (Argyre quadrangle).

Latitude dependent mantle
  
Much of the Martian surface is covered with a thick ice-rich, mantle layer that has fallen from the sky a number of times in the past.  It fell as snow and ice-coated dust.  This mantle layer is called "latitude dependent mantle" because its occurrence is related to the latitude.  It is this mantle that cracks and then forms polygonal ground.

The mantle layer lasts for a very long time before all the ice is gone because a protective lag deposit forms on the top.  The mantle contains ice and dust.  After a certain amount of ice disappears from sublimation the dust stays on the top, forming the lag deposit.

Mantle forms when the Martian climate is different than the present climate.  The tilt or obliquity of the axis of the planet changes a great deal.     The Earth’s tilt changes little because our rather large moon stabilizes the Earth.  Mars only has two very small moons that do not possess enough gravity to stabilize its tilt.  When the tilt of Mars exceeds around 40 degrees (from today's 25 degrees), ice is deposited in certain bands where much mantle exists today.

Other surface features

Another type of surface is called "brain terrain" as it looks like the surface of a human brain.  Brain terrain lies under polygonal ground when the two are both visible in a region.  
 

Since the top, polygon layer is fairly smooth although the underlying brain terrain is irregular; it is believed that the mantle layer that contains the polygons is 10–20 meters thick.

"Basketball terrain" is another expression of the surface of Mars.  At certain distances it looks like a basketball’s surface.  Close-up pictures have revealed it to consist of piles of rocks.  Many ideas have been advanced to explain how these piles of rocks are formed.

Many steep surfaces in latitude bands near 40 degrees North and South contain gullies.  Some of the gullies show polygons.  These have been called "gullygons."

Complex polygonal patterned ground

On the Earth
On the Earth, polygonal, patterned ground is present in ice-rich ground, especially in polar regions.

See also
 Casius quadrangle
 Climate of Mars
 Ismenius Lacus quadrangle
 Latitude dependent mantle
 Patterned ground

References 

Geology of Mars